Callow is a Dream Doom duo based in the San Francisco Bay Area. Its members are Gared Moses (vocals, guitar) and Sami Knowles (drums, keyboard, vocals).  They are known for their dark and doom-y music, and evocative live shows.

History

Gared (aka Red) Moses was born in Vancouver, Washington and moved to Salt Lake City, Utah with his family as a youth.  He began writing and playing music at a young age, and in college he wrote scores for theater productions at Salt Lake Community College.  For several years he operated and co-owned Ruby Records (2000-2005), and wrote for the Indie Music Spotlight (a monthly column in Salt Lake Underground Magazine).  Sami Knowles was born and raised in Utah.  She studied French and Dance at Southern Utah University.  She danced professionally for ABD Productions and many others before becoming a musician.  She traveled to Haiti in 2009 to study Haitian drum and dance with Rara Toulimen.

Former badapple frontman, Gared Moses, formed Callow while in Salt Lake City and enjoyed moderate success before moving to San Francisco, where he met Sami Knowles. They reformed Callow as a duo and began playing together in the fall of 2009.

Their first album, Orb Weaver, was recorded and mixed by themselves and various friends while touring and travelling.  It was released on Portland-based indie label NXNW Records in May 2012. SLUG Magazine compared it to The Velvet Underground saying; "what punk rock would have been had it evolved from The Velvet Underground's airy slowness rather than their minimalism."  The song "Old Horse" was voted "Best Song" by Noise Pop voters in the San Francisco Music Video Race 2013.

Their second album, Blue Spells, was recorded live to Magnetic Tape in their home studio, and was released on cassette by NXNW Records.  The San Francisco Chronicle described it as "haunting and beautiful, with angst and tension balanced with primal minimalism."

Blues Spells was premiered by Surviving the Golden Age, and ranked in the top five in a Magnet (magazine) poll.  Moses' vocals were compared to a "tortured and slowcore-laden doppelganger of Adam Stephens of Two Gallants."

The Single "Strange" was premiered by The Vinyl District, and was Song of the Day on KDHX radio.  The single "Philosophy" was premiered by Mad Mackerel, and described as "a sweetly sombre classic of pensive restraint and yearning melancholy that leaves palpable echoes hanging in the air long after the song has finished."  Songs "Black" and "The Heavy Sermon" were mixed by Brandon Eggleston (sound engineer for Swans, The Mountain Goats, Tune-Yards).  The rest of the album was mixed by Rob Bartleson and Yarn F Miners at Haywire Records in Portland.

Their 2013/2014 Blue Spells tour included official showcases at Sled Island and CMJ, and several shows at SXSW.

2018 saw the release of the third album, Mothdust, on vinyl. The Bay Bridged noted that; "all their previous releases have a certain degree of grit, but their confidence and chops are really on display here."

Members

Gared Moses - vocals, guitar
Sami Knowles - drums, keyboard, vocals

Former Members

Tim Watson - bass
Tony Esterbrooks - drums
Branden Jenkins - drums 
Rob Goodson - guitar (Warm Soda, Thought Riot)

Collaborators

Brandon Eggleston - mixing, Blue Spells & Mothdust
Sammy Fielding (Ancient Owl) - recording & mixing, Mothdust
Pall Jenkins - musical saw (The Black Heart Procession, Three Mile Pilot)
Joey Chang - cello (CelloJoe)
David Conway - recording & mixing, Orb Weaver
Alex Laipenieks - recording & mixing, EP
Mike Stone - recording & mixing, Orb Weaver

Discography

Albums

 Orb Weaver (May 3, 2012) - CD, Download
 Blue Spells (Nov 19, 2013) - CD, Cassette, Download
Mothdust (Oct 19, 2018) - Vinyl, Download

EPs

 Self-Titled (June, 2010) - out of print

Singles

 "Always About The Ones Who Have It All" (Jan 20, 2017)
"Go Down" (May 18, 2017)
"Strange" (August 30, 2013) - Download
 "Philosophy" - (October 24, 2013) - Download

References

External links
Callow official website

American experimental musical groups
Feminist musicians
Indie rock musical groups from California
Musical groups established in 2009
Musical groups from San Francisco
Rock music duos